is a city located in the eastern part of Ehime Prefecture, Japan. , the city had an estimated population of 115,824 in 57781 households and a population density of 490 persons per km². It has the third largest population in Ehime, behind the prefectural capital of Matsuyama and the recently expanded city of Imabari. It is famous for its Besshi copper mine as well as the annual Niihama Taiko Festival (also known as "The Man Festival", otokomatsuri 男祭り) that is the center of annual drunken and boisterous activity and draws tourists from around the country.

Geography

Niihama is positioned in the north-center area of the island of Shikoku, in the eastern part of Ehime Prefecture. Niihama is enveloped by mountains to the south and east, hills to the west, and the Seto Inland Sea to the north. The Kokuryo River flows from the mountains to the Seto Inland Sea and divides the city into an areas east of the river (kawahigashi) and west of the river (kawanishi). Being surrounded by mountains, Niihama feels geographically isolated from its closest neighbors, Saijō to the west and Shikokuchūō to the east. The border with Kōchi Prefecture lies in the mountains far south of the center of town. The island of Ōshima, northeast of the main part of the city, also is part of Niihama. The largely mountainous village of Besshi joined the city of Niihama in 2003 greatly increasing the size of the city.

Neighbouring municipalities 
Ehime Prefecture
 Saijō
Shikokuchūō
Kōchi Prefecture
 Ino
  Ōkawa

Climate
Niihama has a Humid subtropical climate (Köppen Cfa) characterized by warm summers and cool winters with light snowfall.  The average annual temperature in Niihama is 13.2 °C. The average annual rainfall is 1839 mm with September as the wettest month. The temperatures are highest on average in January, at around 24.4 °C, and lowest in January, at around 2.0 °C.

Demographics
Per Japanese census data, the population of Niihama has been decreased sightly since the 1980s.

History
Niihama is located in ancient Iyo Province and has been inhabited since prehistoric times. Under the Edo Period Tokugawa shogunate, it was largely administered as part of Saijō Domain or Komatsu Domain. The Besshi Copper Mine was opened in 1744. The village of Niihama was established with the post-Meiji restoration creation of the modern municipalities system on December 15, 1889. It was raised to town status on January 1, 1908. On November 3, 1937 Niihama merged with the villages of Kaneko and Takatsu to form the city of Niihama. .

Government
Niihama has a mayor-council form of government with a directly elected mayor and a unicameral city council of 26 members. Niihama contributes four members to the Ehime Prefectural Assembly. In terms of national politics, the city is part of Ehime 3rd district  of the lower house of the Diet of Japan.

Economy

The Besshi copper mine (once considered to be one of the most productive in the world) jump-started the Sumitomo zaibatsu. Even though the mine has since closed (its legacy is now preserved in a small museum and onsen attraction, Minetopia Besshi), Sumitomo remains a large presence in town. The economy of Niihama is supported largely by factories as well as activities at its ports.

Education
Niihama has 17 public elementary schools and 12 public middle schools operated by the city government. The city has five public high schools operated by the Ehime Prefectural Board of Education. The Niihama National College of Technology is a technology college in Niihama.

Transportation

Railways 
 Shikoku Railway Company - Yosan Line
  -  -

Highways 
  Matsuyama Expressway

Ports
 Port of Niihama

Sister city relations
 - Dezhou, Shandong, China, friendship city since November 1997.

Festivals and celebrations

Taiko Festival

The Niihama Taiko Festival is a harvest festival held over 16–18 October each year. Each of 50 neighborhoods in Niihama has its own Taiko float, which consists of an ornately decorated wooden center frame, covered in panels made of gold thread (three to a side). The column is covered with a fabric top (usually red and white), which symbolically represents the sun; it is surrounded by long black cushions folded into a figure of 8 with hanging tassels, representing the clouds and rain. The design is intended to show gratitude for a good harvest. Gold dragons adorn the top panels of the float while the lower panels show traditional buildings, animals or legends. Inside the float, a drummer beats a deep booming taiko drum, providing the rhythm that guides 150 men below, who carry the float by four long wooden beams at the float's base. Four crew members stand on the beams and control the rest of the crew with flags, whistles and chants while four more are perched precariously on the top some 5.4 m above ground.

The floats weigh over two and a half tons and can cost over $100,000US to build (collected by donations within the local area). Men and boys as young as 16 begin the festival before sunrise on its first day by carrying the floats to their local shrine for a blessing by shinto priests. The most spectacular of these happens at Utsunomiya Jinja near Yamane Ground where several floats are carried up many steps at about 4am to a small shrine on the top of a hill. For three days straight (October 16–18), 12 to 14 hours per day, they carry the floats in parades all over the city and park them for display, drinking copious amounts of sake. Sake bottlers even release commemorative bottles with labels featuring pictures of various float-carrying teams.

The main events include a display of the Taiko floats in Yamane Park, Takihama Station, Kasenjiki Park, Shinto shrines across the city and at several Supermarket and shopping complexes (Jusco, Fuji Grand, M2, Co-op). On alternate years there is the spectacle of eight taikodai (floats) being loaded onto barges to travel to another location by sea. The Taiko-carrying teams are known to start fights, in which two teams ram their floats into each other until one or both floats are destroyed.

Local attractions

Zuiō-ji Temple
Zuiō-ji is a Sōtō Zen temple at the edge of the mountains in south Niihama. It welcomes foreign visitors to participate in a Sunday morning zazen meditation session, or even to stay overnight. It is the largest Buddhist temple in Niihama.

Waterfalls
The mountainous area between Niihama and the village of Besshi includes two major waterfalls: Chōshi no Taki and Mato no Taki (Waterfall at the Demon's Door).

Otedama
Niihama is home to the national headquarters of the Otedama no Kai (お手玉の会, Traditional Japanese Juggling Association).

Planetarium
Niihama was home to the world's largest planetarium until the renovation of the Nagoya City Science Museum in March 2011.

Notable people form Niihama
 Nana Mizuki, Japanese voice actress and singer

References

External links

 
 Niihama concierge (tourism) 
 Niihama Taiko Festival NHK(video)

 
Cities in Ehime Prefecture
Port settlements in Japan
Populated coastal places in Japan